was a Japanese samurai leader of the Sengoku period. He was known as a brave and skillful warrior so his nickname was 'red Oni (demon) of Tamba Province'.

Naomasa is known for his defense of Kuroi Castle in Tamba Province. In 1578, during the siege of Kuroi Castle, he died of disease; and the responsibility for defending the castle passed to his nephew, Akai Tadaie.

After the death of Akai Naomasa, some members of the Akai clan became retainers under Tōdō Takatora.

References 

Samurai
1529 births
1578 deaths